Lower Mount Walker is a locality split between the Scenic Rim Region and City of Ipswich local government areas of South East Queensland, Australia.

Geography 
The Bremer River passes through the locality.

Lower Mount Walker is home to a remnant swamp tea-tree forest which is considered critically endangered.

History 
Mount Walker Lower Provisional School opened on 12 November 1923. In 1927, the school building was relocated from Mount French to Lower Mount Walker. Mount Walker Lower State School was proclaimed on 19 March 1928. The school closed circa 1945. It was at 286-294 Mount Walker West Road.

The locality contained 70 households, in which 51.4% of the population were males and 48.6% of the population were females with a median age of 44, 6 years above the national average. The average weekly household income was  $1,437, $1 below the national average. None of Lower Mount Walker's population was either of Aborigional or Torres Strait Islander descent. 65.2% of the population aged 15 or over were either registered or de facto married, while 34.8% of the population was not married. 31.5% of the population was currently attending some form of a compulsory education. The most common nominated ancestries were Australian (39.1%), English (21.0%) and Scottish (8.2%), while the most common country of birth was Australia (71.8%), and the most commonly spoken language at home was English (85.0%). The most common nominated religions were Catholic (26.7%), Anglican (20.6%) and Not stated (20.0%). The most common occupation was a cleric/administration worker (22.3%) and the majority/plurality of residents worked 40 or more hours per week (60.2%).

References 

Scenic Rim Region
City of Ipswich
Localities in Queensland